Boško Janković (born 1 March 1984) is a Serbian former footballer who played as a winger for the Serbia national football team. He is an attacking minded player, with the tendency to take long shots and free kicks.

Club career

Red Star Belgrade
Having gone through all age groups in Red Star Belgrade youth setup, 18-year-old Janković earned his first taste of full squad action throughout fall 2002, during first half of 2002–03 season under head coach Zoran Filipović.

However, over the winter 2002–03 break in January 2003, Janković was loaned out to lower division side Jedinstvo Ub along with Dušan Basta and Aleksandar Luković in order to gain valuable experience through regular playing time. Over the next season and a half in Ub, he excelled in attacking midfielder position, scoring 21 league goals in 28 matches. At the beginning of 2003–04 league season, Jankovic along with a group of other Red Star youth players was registered both for Red Star and Jedinstvo, which in practice meant that he trained with Red Star during the week while playing league matches for Jedinstvo on Saturdays. However, following the winter break, head coach Slavoljub Muslin decided to discontinue this practice making the players both train and play with Jedinstvo.

All the success prompted new head coach Ljupko Petrović and the rest in Red Star management to bring Janković back during summer 2004, ahead of the 2004–05 season. The move paid immediate dividends as he scored a spectacular free kick goal versus PSV Eindhoven in the first leg of UEFA Champions League third qualifying round. He followed that up with a notable domestic season in which he scored 10 goals in 25 appearances, showing early signs of the things to come and establishing himself as one of the more important players on the league winning Red Star roster.

Janković truly came into his own throughout the 2005–06 season under head coach Walter Zenga, increasing his league scoring output to 12 goals in 26 appearances while also providing steady service from the right wing to Red Star strikers, most notably Nikola Žigić. At the end of the 2005–06 season, Janković was named Player of the Year.

By this time, he also became a staple in the Serbia-Montenegro under-21 national team with all the exposure leading to increased interest in Janković from abroad. As a result, rumors of a summer 2006 sale became persistent. Still, he started the 2006–07 league season with Red Star, however after only one match, Janković was sold to RCD Mallorca in August 2006 for €3 million.

Mallorca
The 23-year-old's excellent form shown during the 2006–07 season with Mallorca has caught the attention of both FC Barcelona and Valencia CF, but Janković played down the rumors and suggested he wanted to stay a year or two at Mallorca before making a move for one of the major clubs. In his first season with Mallorca, Jankovic was able to score 9 league goals in 28 appearances being himself the top scorer of the team. Chelsea were rumored to be very interested in the youngster and some scouts appeared at the Under 21 Championship Final to watch him.

However, on 28 June Italian Serie A club Palermo announced they have signed the Serbian midfielder to a five-year deal. The transfer fee paid to Mallorca was said to be €8 million.

Palermo
Janković made his scoring debut for Palermo in the UEFA Cup match, but his debut season in Sicily was a disappointment, as he rarely got opportunities to prove himself in the first half of the season, though his playing time and quality of play improved somewhat during the second half of the season.

Genoa
On 1 September 2008, he signed for Genoa on loan from Palermo.

In the summer of 2009, Genoa reportedly exercised a clause in his loan contract to buy full ownership of the player and thus make the deal a permanent one. However, Janković got injured at the start of the season after making only three league appearances. He played for Genoa until summer 2013. when he completed his transfer to Verona.

International career
Janković played for Serbia U21 in the 2007 UEFA European Under-21 Championship where he scored a goal against the Czech Republic in Serbia's second group B match. Serbia finished in second place in the tournament with Janković named in the UEFA Team of the Tournament.

Janković scored his first goal for Serbia against Portugal in a Euro 2008 qualifying match on 28 March 2007. He then followed up with another goal versus Finland in another Euro 2008 qualifying match on 2 June 2007.

Although a regular, Janković missed out on the 2010 FIFA World Cup due to injury.

Career statistics

Club

International

International goals

Honours
Red Star Belgrade
First League of Serbia and Montenegro: 2005–06
Serbia and Montenegro Cup: 2005–06

References

External links

1984 births
Living people
Serbian footballers
Footballers from Belgrade
Association football midfielders
Serbia international footballers
Serbia under-21 international footballers
Serbia and Montenegro under-21 international footballers
Red Star Belgrade footballers
FK Jedinstvo Ub players
First League of Serbia and Montenegro players
Serbian SuperLiga players
RCD Mallorca players
La Liga players
Palermo F.C. players
Genoa C.F.C. players
Hellas Verona F.C. players
Serie A players
Serbian expatriate footballers
Serbian expatriate sportspeople in Spain
Serbian expatriate sportspeople in Italy
Expatriate footballers in Italy
Expatriate footballers in Spain